Hristo Nikolov-Choko (born 3 September 1939 in Varna) is a retired Bulgarian football player. Nikolov was a central forward.
He played with PFC Spartak Varna and earned 167 caps in the Bulgarian first division, scoring 48 goals.

References

External links
 Birthday announcement at Events.bg
 Global Football Database

1939 births
Living people
Bulgarian footballers
PFC Spartak Varna players
First Professional Football League (Bulgaria) players
Association football forwards